Jack Taggart, Jr. (born February 3, 1950 - May 2022)
was a Canadian retired professional ice hockey defenceman. Taggart was selected by the St. Louis Blues in the seventh round (85th overall) of the 1970 NHL Entry Draft.

Born in 1950 in Calgary, Alberta, Taggart played with the Canada men's national ice hockey team during the 1968-69 season, and then attended the University of Denver where he played with the Denver Pioneers men's ice hockey team. 
In January 1970, Taggart suffered serious injuries to his head and jaw as a result of a car accident.

Taggart began his professional career in 1970, and played the 1970–71 season with the St. Louis Blues' top farm team, the Kansas City Blues of the Central Hockey League. The following season and a half was spent in the American Hockey League with the Cincinnati Swords, and he concluded his playing career with the Charlotte Checkers of the EHL following the 1972-73 season.

Personal information 
Taggart's father, Jack Taggart Sr., played with Team Canada at the 1955 World Ice Hockey Championships.

References

External links

1950 births
Living people
Canadian ice hockey defencemen
Cincinnati Swords players
Denver Pioneers men's ice hockey players
St. Louis Blues draft picks
Ice hockey people from Calgary